Edinburgh International College (EIC), established in 2010, was an associate college of Edinburgh Napier University in Scotland. Operated by Navitas, EIC provided international students with pathway programmes that enabled them to graduate with full degrees from Edinburgh Napier University. The college was located in Napier University buildings near Bruntsfield, Edinburgh. Note: Edinburgh International College closed down on 7 September 2018.

EIC currently offers international students entry to degree-level and Pre-Masters programmes in subject areas such as Accounting and Finance, Business, Tourism and Computing, with further subjects expected to be available in 2011. While studying at EIC, students have full access to university facilities, including 24/7 computer labs, libraries and the Students Union. Class sizes are no bigger than 35 students, and additional English Language support is available if required.

External links 
 Edinburgh International College
 Edinburgh Napier University

Edinburgh Napier University
2010 establishments in Scotland
Educational institutions established in 2010